The Lady Gambles is a 1949 American film noir drama film directed by Michael Gordon and starring Barbara Stanwyck, Robert Preston and Stephen McNally.

Plot
When his estranged wife Joan is found badly beaten after using loaded dice in a back-alley game, David Boothe looks back on how she came to this sorry state.

A reporter from Chicago, he is on an assignment at Boulder Dam, so he and his wife stay at a hotel in Las Vegas. There the casino's owner, Corrigan, introduces her to gambling with a few chips on the house.

Joan eventually loses $600 of David's expense money, as well as pawning a camera, before winning it back. Gambling excites her. When her sister Ruth joins them in Nevada, her husband decides to leave. Ruth has always been a divisive presence, manipulative and neurotic.

Corrigan flirts with Joan and persuades her to be his proxy in a poker game. She wins $4,000 and is given a share. But the game lasts till dawn, and when David phones from the road, Ruth tells him Joan has not slept in her bed all night.

He returns to Vegas and can see how gambling has her hooked. David quits his job and takes her to Mexico, where he intends to write a book. A couple Joan met in Vegas get her into a dice game, where she loses all of their life savings. David leaves, intending to file for a divorce.

Not knowing where else to go, Joan returns to Vegas, where she is hired by Corrigan to front a horse-racing operation. But she double-crosses his partners just to cash in on a long-shot bet. On her own again, Joan descends into a world of disreputable characters, partnering in Shreveport with a crooked gambler named Frenchy.

By the time David rejoins her after the beating, Joan is hospitalized and suicidal. He must fight to convince her that it is not too late to kick her gambling habit and save their marriage.

Cast
Barbara Stanwyck as Joan Phillips Boothe
Robert Preston as David Boothe
Stephen McNally as Horace Corrigan
Edith Barrett as Ruth Phillips
John Hoyt as Dr. Rojac
Elliott Sullivan as Barky
John Harmon as Frenchy
Philip Van Zandt as Chuck Benson
Leif Erickson as Tony
Curt Conway as Bank Clerk
Houseley Stevenson as Pawnbroker
Don Beddoe as Mr. Dennis Sutherland
Nana Bryant as Mrs. Dennis Sutherland
Tony Curtis as Bellboy (as Anthony Curtis)
Peter Leeds as Jack Harrison, Hotel Clerk
Frank Moran as Murphy
Esther Howard as Gross Lady
John Indrisano as Bert

Reception

The Philadelphia Inquirer was unimpressed: "The long story of her transformation from a happy wife to a fanatic who would shoot her husband’s last dollar is unfolded in all its far from fascinating detail. The role...hardly calls for Miss Stanwyck’s best. She does what she can, which isn't too much considering the ridiculous motivation of the part and the pre-posterousness of that hysterical condition. Robert Preston has a terrible time as the husband, but Stephen McNally at least manages to put some color into the Casino proprietor who leads Barbara farther and farther astray before leaving her flat..."

Notable
The Lady Gambles is Tony Curtis's third film, in a bit part lasting less than 10 seconds on screen. He has four lines.

References

External links

 

1949 films
1949 drama films
American drama films
American black-and-white films
Films directed by Michael Gordon
Films set in Chicago
Films set in the Las Vegas Valley
Films about gambling
Universal Pictures films
Films scored by Frank Skinner
1940s English-language films
1940s American films